Jan Økseter (born 19 February 1945 in Aurdal, Oppland) is a retired Norwegian handball player who competed in the 1972 Summer Olympics.

He was born in Aurdal and represented the club Elverum IL. In 1972 he was part of the Norwegian team which finished ninth in the Olympic tournament. He played three matches.

References

1945 births
Living people
People from Nord-Aurdal
Norwegian male handball players
Olympic handball players of Norway
Handball players at the 1972 Summer Olympics
Sportspeople from Innlandet